Thierry Venant (born 28 December 1960) is a French archer. He competed in the men's individual and team events at the 1988 Summer Olympics.

References

1960 births
Living people
French male archers
Olympic archers of France
Archers at the 1988 Summer Olympics
Sportspeople from Nord (French department)